The Four-man bobsleigh competition at the 2006 Winter Olympics in Turin, Italy was held on 24 and 25 February, at Cesana Pariol.

Records
While the IOC does not consider bobsled times eligible for Olympic records, the FIBT does maintain records for both the start and a complete run at each track it competes.

Prior to this competition, the existing Cesana Pariol track records were as follows.

The following track records were established during this event.

Results

Twenty-six sleds were entered in the four-man event, with one, from New Zealand, not starting the first run after crashing in training.

After the third run, only the top twenty sleds by combined time were allowed to compete in the final run. The final ranking was determined by the combined time of each sled over the four runs.

References

Bobsleigh at the 2006 Winter Olympics
Men's bobsleigh at the 2006 Winter Olympics
Men's events at the 2006 Winter Olympics